Kent Smith (born September 4, 1966) is the Senator of the 21st district of the Ohio Senate.  Smith is a resident of Euclid, Ohio, and previously served as a Representative in the Ohio House of Representatives from 2015-2022 and on the Euclid School Board for 12 years.  He also served as head of the Democratic Party for Euclid, and has a degree from the Maxine Goodman Levin College of Urban Affairs at Cleveland State University. In 2014, Smith opted to run for the Ohio House of Representatives to replace Armond Budish, who was term-limited and sought election instead as Cuyahoga County Executive. He faced Republican Mikhail Alterman and Independent Jocelyn Conwell, and won with 71.47% of the vote. He would go on to be re-elected in 2016 and 2018.

References

Links
official campaign website
Twitter page

1966 births
Living people
Democratic Party members of the Ohio House of Representatives
Democratic Party Ohio state senators
People from Euclid, Ohio
Cleveland State University alumni
School board members in Ohio
21st-century American politicians
Miami University alumni